August Rei's cabinet was in office in Estonia from 4 December 1928 to 9 July 1929, when it was succeeded by Otto Strandman's second cabinet.

Members

This cabinet's members were the following:

References

Cabinets of Estonia